John William Loux (1818 – December 20, 1886) was a farmer, miller and political figure in Canada West, He represented Russell in the Legislative Assembly of the Province of Canada from 1858 to 1861. His surname also appears as Loucks.

He was born John William Loucks, the son of John William Loucks and Alta Moseley. Loux was a major and paymaster for a lancer squadron that served during the Upper Canada Rebellion. He owned a flour mill and sawmill at Russell, where he settled in 1850. He died in Russell at the age of 68.

References 

1818 births
1886 deaths
Members of the Legislative Assembly of the Province of Canada from Canada West